Polymerase delta-interacting protein 3 is an enzyme that in humans is encoded by the POLDIP3 gene.

This gene encodes a protein that interacts with the DNA polymerase delta p50 subunit. This protein is a specific target of S6 kinase 1 and regulates cell growth. Two transcript variants that encode different protein isoforms have been identified.

Interactions
POLDIP3 has been shown to interact with P70-S6 Kinase 1.

References

Further reading